Guzmania stenostachya is a plant species in the genus Guzmania. This species is native to Costa Rica and Panama.

References

stenostachya
Flora of Costa Rica
Flora of Panama
Plants described in 1937